Megvii is a Chinese technology company that designs image recognition and deep-learning software. Based in Beijing, the company develops artificial intelligence (AI) technology for businesses and for the public sector. In 2019, the company was valued at $USD 4 billion. Megvii is the largest provider of third-party authentication software in the world, and its product, Face++, is the world's largest computer vision platform. The company has faced U.S. investment and export restrictions due to allegations of aiding the Uyghur genocide.

History

The company was founded in Beijing with Megvii standing for "mega vision." The company's core product, Face++, launched in 2012 as the first online facial recognition platform in China. In 2015 Megvii created Brain++, a deep-learning engine to help train its algorithms. 
 
Megvii raised $100 million in 2016, $460 million in 2017 and $750 million in May 2019.
 
In 2017, Megvii marketed authentication and computational photography functions to smart phone companies and mobile application developers, then smart logistics. Megvii's AI-empowered products include personal IoT, city IoT and supply chain IoT. In 2017 and 2018, Megvii beat Google, Facebook, and Microsoft in tests of image recognition at the International Conference on Computer Vision.

By June 2019, Megvii had 2,349 employees, and was valued at over $4 billion, as the "world’s biggest provider of third-party authentication software", with 339 corporate clients in 112 cities in China. The Chinese government employs Megvii software.

In May 2019, Human Rights Watch reported finding Face++ code in the Integrated Joint Operations Platform (IJOP), a police surveillance app used to collect data on, and track the Uighur community in Xinjiang. Human Rights Watch released a correction to its report in June 2019 stating that Megvii did not appear to have collaborated on IJOP, and that the Face++ code in the app was inoperable.

In March 2020, Megvii announced that it would make its deep learning framework MegEngine open-source.

U.S. sanctions 

Megvii was sanctioned by the U.S. Government, and placed on the United States Bureau of Industry and Security's Entity List on October 9, 2019, due to the use of its technology for human rights abuses against Uyghurs in Xinjiang. In December 2021, the United States Department of the Treasury prohibited all U.S. investment in Megvii, accusing the company of complicity in aiding the Uyghur genocide.

References

External links 

 

2011 establishments in China
Software companies of China
Companies based in Beijing
Facial recognition software
Data mining and machine learning software
Chinese brands